The Drouth is an American-format quarterly periodical published in Glasgow, Scotland. It was founded in 2001 by Mitchell Miller and Johnny Rodger.

Although its title is Scots (Eng: The Thirst), the magazine is published mostly in Scottish Standard English, with features and fiction regularly appearing in languages such as French, Italian, Spanish, Broad Scots and Scottish Gaelic.

The Drouth is unusual for a Scottish literary magazine in that it only infrequently publishes poetry, arguing that as poetry covers a good portion of other magazines' content, its efforts are better focused on other art-forms less well represented in Scotland's "small mags". The magazine works on a commissioning basis, and does not encourage unsolicited submissions. It has a particular focus on literature, film and politics but also covers visual art, music, architecture, photography and comix, as well as giving generous space to creative fiction.

The magazine sponsors a number of cultural events, mostly in Glasgow. Every issue also features a guest editor (usually someone of distinction in a given field) and guest cover artist.

Editorial stance
The Drouths editorial stance could be described as non-aligned left with occasional anarchistic and libertarian overtones as shown by its ties to radical online publications such as Pulse and Spinwatch, and with the author James Kelman. Nevertheless, it also publishes work by more establishment figures on the left and right of the political spectrum, and editorial board members such as Owen Dudley Edwards retain links to the Scottish National Party and Plaid Cymru. The magazine is a frequent critic of the Scottish Labour Party but maintains it follows no party alignment and is uncommitted on the issue of Scottish independence.

In general, the magazine has taken an aggressively non-institutional stance and has found common cause with magazines such as Variant, though it retains an independent approach on political issues and does not maintain formal links with major organisations and institutions. Its editorial board is nevertheless, drawn from a mainly institutional background across the two major Scottish cities and currently consists of:

David Archibald, Lecturer, Dept of Film Theatre and Television The University of Glasgow (2006–present)
Gerard Carruthers, Head of Dept of Scottish Literature, The University of Glasgow (2001–present)
Steve Davismoon, Composer and lecturer at Napier University, Edinburgh (2003–present)
Owen Dudley Edwards, Reader in History, The University of Edinburgh (2001–present)
Dorian Grieve, Editor and Researcher in Linguistics, University of Glasgow (2004–present)
Simon Kovesi, Head of English and Modern Languages, Oxford Brookes University (2009–present)
Emily Munro, Head of Learning, Glasgow Film Theatre (2008–present)
Ruaridh Nicoll, Journalist and novelist (2004–present)
Miriam Ross, Researcher in film and related studies (also web editor) (2010)
Elke Weissmann, Lecturer, Liverpool Edgehill University

Editorial board members primarily offer advice, but can also commission work, initiate ideas for issues and get involved in production. Several editorial board members were initially guest editors who joined the permanent staff.

Guest editors
Since issue 6, a guest editor has been invited to contribute editorial essays and advice.  There has been no guest editor for issues 9, 25 and 33, and the lineup has included pseudonymous and spoof entries. The full list is as follows;

Issue 6: "Fact", Frank Kuppner, novelist
Issue 7: "Complexity", Edwin Morgan, poet
Issue 8: "Panegyric", Jenni Calder, writer
Issue 10: "Word"
Issue 11: "Monument", Miles Glendinning, architectural critic
Issue 12: "Bigotry", Gowan Calder, actress
Issue 13: "Intelligence", Christopher Harvie, writer and academic
Issue 14: "Land", Ruaridh Nicoll, journalist and novelist
Issue 15: "Consensus and Revision", Sarah Dunnigan, expert on ballads
Issue 16: "Didactic", Muhammad Idrees Ahmad, media analyst
Issue 17: "Form", Elke Weissmann, cultural critic and researcher in television studies
Issue 18: "Class", Willy Maley, writer and academic
Issue 19: "Dialect", Carol Baranuik, expert on Ullans (Ulster Scots)
Issue 20: "Image", John Calcutt, Lecturer at Glasgow School of art
Issue 21: "Document", Jonathan Murray, expert on Scottish cinema and history
Issue 22: "Utopia", Sheila Dickson, academic and translator
Issue 23: "Deviant", Mark Cousins, critic and filmmaker
Issue 24: "Skin", Craig Richardson, artist and academic
Issue 26: "Collect", Rosemary Goring, Arts Editor, The Herald
Issue 27: "Pure", Emily Munro, writer and film programmer
Issue 28: "Establishment", Molly Maguire, poet
Issue 29: "Union", Ian S. Wood, historian
Issue 30: "Public", Ashley Shelby Benites, author
Issue 31: "Rhetoric", John Knox, reformer
Issue 32: "Moral", Jen Birks, media analyst
Issue 34: "Lost", Rhona Brown, writer and academic
Issue 35: "Process", Simon Kovesi, critic and academic

Guest artists
Since issue 14, guest artists from fine art, illustration, photography and even film, have been invited to provide covers to each issue -
Issue 14: "Land", David Shrigley, installation
Issue 15: "Consensus and Revision", Margaret Tait, experimental film
Issue 16: "Didactic", Andreas Kaiser, installation
Issue 17: "Form", Toby Paterson, painting
Issue 18: "Class", Ken Currie, painting
Issue 19: "Dialect", Mark Neville, photography/performance
Issue 20: "Image", Alasdair Gray, illustration
Issue 21: "Document", Aaron Valdez, experimental film
Issue 22: "Utopia", Stephan Klenner Otto, illustration
Issue 23: "Deviant", Louise Galea, photography.
Issue 24: "Skin", Craig Richardson, installation
Issue 25: "Epic/Lyric", Euan Sutherland, illustration
Issue 26: "Collect", Andrew Lee, photography
Issue 27: "Pure", John Kay, illustration
Issue 28: "Establishment', Stuart Murray, illustration
Issue 29: "Union", Steve Ovett Effect, performance/illustration
Issue 30: "Public", Bill Breckinridge, photography
Issue 31: "Rhetoric", Alexandra Demenkova, documentary photography
Issue 32: "Moral", Stephen Healy, photography
Issue 33: "Solution", Chris Dooks, photography
Issue 34: "Lost", Ian McCulloch, painting
Issue 35: "Process", Roddy Buchanan, photography

Books and related media
The Drouth has recently published two books based partly on essays and features that first appeared in its pages; in 2009 it published Fickle Man: Robert Burns in the 21st Century (Sandstone Press) and in 2010, Tartan Pimps: Gordon Brown, Margaret Thatcher & the New Scotland (Argyll Publishing).

Notable contributors

Angus Calder
Gowan Calder
Jenni Calder
Eddie Campbell
Noam Chomsky
Jem Cohen
Ken Currie
Stephen Davismoon

Owen Dudley Edwards
Roberto Fabbriciani
John Gray
Dorian Grieve
Murray Grigor
Sileas na Keppoch
Simon Kovesi

Frank Kuppner
Carl MacDougall
Donald MacLeod
Edwin Morgan
Jonny Murray
Ruaridh Nicoll
Andrew O'Hagan

Paul O’Keeffe
Juana Ponce de Leon
Jake Mahaffy
George Monbiot
Ashley Shelby
David Stenhouse
Sherien Sultan

See also
 List of magazines published in Scotland

External links
The Drouth

2001 establishments in Scotland
Arts in Scotland
Literary magazines published in Scotland
Magazines established in 2001
Mass media in Glasgow
Quarterly magazines published in the United Kingdom
Visual arts magazines published in the United Kingdom